New Jersey's 28th Legislative District is one of 40 in the New Jersey Legislature. As of the 2011 apportionment, the district includes the Essex County municipalities of Bloomfield, Glen Ridge, Irvington and Nutley, along with portions of Newark (which is also part of the 29th District).

Demographic characteristics
As of the 2020 United States census, the district had a population of 252,742, of whom 191,494 (75.8%) were of voting age. The racial makeup of the district was 53,547 (21.2%) White, 136,126 (53.9%) African American, 1,242 (0.5%) Native American, 10,794 (4.3%) Asian, 96 (0.0%) Pacific Islander, 28,388 (11.2%) from some other race, and 22,549 (8.9%) from two or more races. Hispanic or Latino of any race were 51,058 (20.2%) of the population.

The district had 162,994 registered voters as of December 1, 2021, of whom 60,781 (37.3%) were registered as unaffiliated, 86,702 (53.2%) were registered as Democrats, 13,745 (8.4%) were registered as Republicans, and 1,766 (1.1%) were registered to other parties.

Political representation
For the 2022–2023 session, the district is represented in the State Senate by Renee Burgess (D, Irvington) and in the General Assembly by Ralph R. Caputo (D, Nutley) and Cleopatra Tucker (D, Newark).

The legislative district overlaps with 10th and 11th congressional districts.

Apportionment history
Since the creation of the 28th District in 1973 with the first drawing of the 40-district legislative map, the district has always included Irvington and a portion of western Newark. In the 1973 through 1981 version of the district, South Orange was also included in the district. In the 1981 redistricting, it only consisted of Irvington and most of Newark's North Ward. Following the 1991 redistricting, the 28th expanded to South Orange again and Maplewood for the first time. In the 2001 redistricting, the district stretched from Irvington, to a narrow strip of Newark, and into Belleville and Bloomfield. After the 2011 redistricting, Belleville moved to the 29th District while the 28th picked up Glen Ridge and Nutley. As a result of this redistricting, long-time Belleville resident and incumbent Assemblyman Ralph R. Caputo moved to Nutley to run for re-election.

In the 1970s, there was a high turnover rate among the district's legislators. The first pair of Assemblymen only served one term; Philip Keegan who would later become the head of the State Democratic Party retired in 1975 while the incumbent Rocco Neri was defeated by Peter Shapiro who was ultimately elected in the general election and became the state's youngest ever legislator at the age of 23. The County Organization candidate that did win in 1975, Patrick Scanlon, died on June 11, 1977, and was replaced on the general election ballot by his wife, Mary. In the November 1977 special election to complete the remainder of Scanlon's term, a Seton Hall graduate student named Joseph Papasidero won to serve for two months in the Assembly. 1979 brought more changes to the district's delegation. Shapiro resigned in January to become Essex County's first Executive while Senator Martin L. Greenberg resigned in August for personal reasons. Newark Fire Chief John P. Caufield won the November 1979 special election for Greenberg's Senate seat while Remay Pearce won to serve for the remainder of Shapiro's Assembly term making her the first African American woman elected to the Assembly from the district.

Through the 1980s, the district's delegation remained relatively stable with Michael F. Adubato, brother of Newark power broker Steve Adubato Sr., and James Zangari serving in the Assembly from the 28th throughout the entire decade. Caufield died of cancer on August 24, 1986, and was replaced in the Senate by Newark councilman Ronald Rice who still serves in the Senate from this district today.

Major shifts would occur in the district's representatives in the 2000s decade. Donald Kofi Tucker died on October 17, 2005, weeks before the 2005 general election in which he was a candidate. Tucker won the election posthumously which meant the Essex County Democratic Committee members would choose a person to serve the remainder of Tucker's unexpired term and a temporary replacement for the 2006 session. Former Newark School Board President Evelyn Williams was chosen in a vote over Essex County Freeholder and former Republican Assemblyman Ralph R. Caputo to serve in the unexpired term. However, soon after she was sworn into the Assembly in December, Williams was arrested on shoplifting charges. Williams would step down shortly before the end of the session of the legislature leaving one seat vacant again. Librarian and Newark South Ward Democratic activist Oadline Truitt was chosen by the committee to serve until a November 2006 special election that she also won. Truitt and incumbent Assemblyman Craig A. Stanley were defeated in the 2007 Democratic primary by the Cory Booker-backed ticket of Caputo and Cleopatra Tucker, widow of Donald Tucker.

The district, due to its urban core, leans very heavily to the Democratic Party having only elected Democrats to the state legislature. The 28th is one of the few districts statewide to have only elected members of one party to the legislature. The closest races for the legislature in this district are as a result of independent politicians receiving a large share of the vote in some elections. For example, the lowest winning percentages for the Democratic candidates occurred in 1979 when Harry A. McEnroe and Zangari won 29.92% and 27.98% of the total vote respectively (57.9% total), while the two Republican candidates combined had 27.3% of the vote. Three independent candidates received 14.8% of the vote, 7.6% of which were for incumbent Assemblywoman Mary Scanlon who ran as an independent when she lost the party committee's backing in the primary election.

Election history
Senators and Assembly members elected from the district are as follows:

Election results

Senate

General Assembly

References

Essex County, New Jersey
28